= Ann Arbor Veterans Memorial Arena =

Indoor arena in Ann Arbor, Michigan

Coordinates: 42.281103°N 83.778777°W

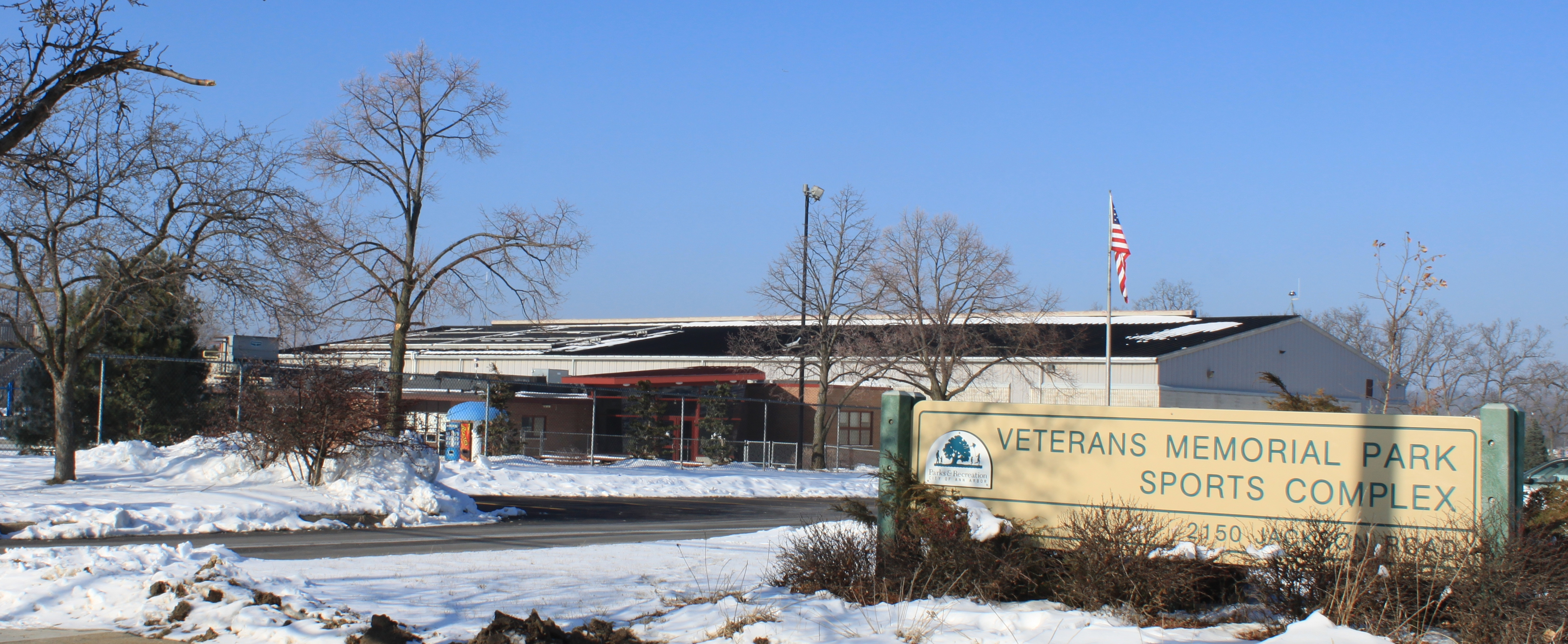
Veterans Memorial Park Sports Complex

Ann Arbor Veterans Memorial Arena is an 800-seat indoor arena built in 1972, located in Ann Arbor, Michigan, United States. It is used primarily for ice hockey, and is home to high school and recreational ice hockey teams.

It is part of Ann Arbor Veterans Memorial Park, and contains a pro shop, concessions and vending machines.

Also located onsite are an outdoor pool, indoor ice arena, baseball and softball fields, tennis courts, a skatepark and a shelter available to rent.

The Veterans Memorial Arena is located at 2150 Jackson Avenue.
